The Born Free Tour is the second headlining concert tour by English stage actress and singer Kerry Ellis with Brian May. The original 2012 tour comprised 11 dates in and around the home counties of England, beginning on 5 November 2012 at the Apex in Bury St Edmunds, and finishing at the Swan Theatre in High Wycombe.

A second leg will tour further venues in England, and also visit Ireland and Wales. It will begin on 17 June 2013 at St John Evangelist Church, Oxford, and finish at the Dublin Olympia on 30 June 2013. A third leg will see Ellis and May taking The Born Free Tour to mainland Europe, for one date in France, one in Austria and four in Italy in July 2013.

Unlike the previously extravagant Anthems: The Tour (2011), this tour is presented as a series of intimate and acoustic shows performed under candlelight where the pair perform to raise awareness of their work for the Born Free Foundation. Receiving positive reviews, the tour was complimented by critics for the pairing of May's sound and Ellis' vocals.

Ellis and May released a live album from the first leg of The Born Free Tour, Acoustic by Candlelight, available digitally, on CD, and on vinyl. The album was released on 17 June 2013 to coincide with the second leg of the tour.

Tour dates

Setlist

First leg

{{hidden
| headercss = background: #ccccff; font-size: 100%; width: 100%;
| contentcss = text-align: left; font-size: 100%; width: 100%;
| header = 5 November 2012
| content =
"Born Free"
"I Loved A Butterfly"
"I (Who Have Nothing)"
"Dust in the Wind"
"Cosi Celeste"
"Somebody to Love"
"Nothing Really Has Changed"
"Life Is Real"
"The Way We Were"
"Since You've Been Gone"
"'39"
"Something"
"Love Of My Life"
"I'm Not That Girl"
"No-One but You (Only the Good Die Young)"
"Last Horizon"
"Tie Your Mother Down"
"Can't Be Your Friend"
"Knockin' on Heaven's Door"
"We Will Rock You"
"We Are the Champions"
Encore
"Born Free"
"Crazy Little Thing Called Love"
}}

{{hidden
| headercss = background: #ccccff; font-size: 100%; width: 100%;
| contentcss = text-align: left; font-size: 100%; width: 100%;
| header = 6 November 2012
| content =
"Born Free"
"I Loved A Butterfly"
"I (Who Have Nothing)"
"Dust in the Wind"
"Cosi Celeste"
"Somebody to Love"
"Nothing Really Has Changed"
"Life Is Real"
"The Way We Were"
"'39"
"Something"
"Love Of My Life"
"I'm Not That Girl"
"No-One but You (Only the Good Die Young)"
"Last Horizon"
"Tie Your Mother Down"
"Can't Be Your Friend"
"We Will Rock You"
"We Are the Champions"
Encore
"Born Free"
"Crazy Little Thing Called Love"
}}

{{hidden
| headercss = background: #ccccff; font-size: 100%; width: 100%;
| contentcss = text-align: left; font-size: 100%; width: 100%;
| header = 7 November 2012
| content =
"Born Free"
"I Loved A Butterfly"
"I (Who Have Nothing)"
"Dust in the Wind"
"Cosi Celeste"
"Somebody to Love"
"Nothing Really Has Changed"
"Life Is Real"
"The Way We Were"
"'39"
"Something"
"Love Of My Life"
"I'm Not That Girl"
"No-One but You (Only the Good Die Young)"
"Last Horizon"
"Tie Your Mother Down"
"Can't Be Your Friend"
"We Will Rock You"
"We Are the Champions"
Encore
"Born Free"
"Crazy Little Thing Called Love"
}}

{{hidden
| headercss = background: #ccccff; font-size: 100%; width: 100%;
| contentcss = text-align: left; font-size: 100%; width: 100%;
| header = 9 November 2012
| content =
"Born Free"
"I Loved A Butterfly"
"I (Who Have Nothing)"
"Dust in the Wind"
"Cosi Celeste"
"Somebody to Love"
"Nothing Really Has Changed"
"Life Is Real"
"The Way We Were"
"'39"
"Something"
"Love Of My Life"
"I'm Not That Girl"
"No-One but You (Only the Good Die Young)"
"Last Horizon"
"Tie Your Mother Down"
"Can't Be Your Friend"
"We Will Rock You"
"We Are the Champions"
Encore
"Born Free"
"Crazy Little Thing Called Love"
}}

{{hidden
| headercss = background: #ccccff; font-size: 100%; width: 100%;
| contentcss = text-align: left; font-size: 100%; width: 100%;
| header = 10 November 2012
| content =
"Born Free"
"I Loved A Butterfly"
"I (Who Have Nothing)"
"Dust in the Wind"
"Kissing Me"
"Somebody to Love"
"Nothing Really Has Changed"
"Life Is Real"
"The Way We Were"
"Since You've Been Gone"
"'39"
"Something"
"Love Of My Life"
"I'm Not That Girl"
"No-One but You (Only the Good Die Young)"
"Last Horizon"
"Tie Your Mother Down"
"Can't Be Your Friend"
"Knockin' on Heaven's Door"
"We Will Rock You"
"We Are the Champions"
Encore
"In the Bleak Midwinter"
"Born Free"
"Crazy Little Thing Called Love"
}}

{{hidden
| headercss = background: #ccccff; font-size: 100%; width: 100%;
| contentcss = text-align: left; font-size: 100%; width: 100%;
| header = 11 November 2012
| content =
"Born Free"
"I Loved A Butterfly"
"I (Who Have Nothing)"
"Dust in the Wind"
"Kissing Me"
"Somebody to Love"
"Nothing Really Has Changed"
"Life Is Real"
"The Way We Were"
"Since You've Been Gone"
"'39"
"Something"
"Love Of My Life"
"I'm Not That Girl"
"No-One but You (Only the Good Die Young)"
"Last Horizon"
"Tie Your Mother Down"
"Can't Be Your Friend"
"Knockin' on Heaven's Door"
"We Will Rock You"
"We Are the Champions"
Encore
"In the Bleak Midwinter"
"Born Free"
"Crazy Little Thing Called Love"
}}

{{hidden
| headercss = background: #ccccff; font-size: 100%; width: 100%;
| contentcss = text-align: left; font-size: 100%; width: 100%;
| header = 12 November 2012
| content =
"Born Free"
"I Loved A Butterfly"
"I (Who Have Nothing)"
"Dust in the Wind"
"Kissing Me"
"Somebody to Love"
"Nothing Really Has Changed"
"Life Is Real"
"The Way We Were"
"Since You've Been Gone"
"'39"
"Something"
"Love Of My Life"
"I'm Not That Girl"
"No-One but You (Only the Good Die Young)"
"Last Horizon"
"Tie Your Mother Down"
"Can't Be Your Friend"
"Knockin' on Heaven's Door"
"We Will Rock You"
"We Are the Champions"
Encore
"In the Bleak Midwinter"
"Born Free"
"Crazy Little Thing Called Love"
}}

{{hidden
| headercss = background: #ccccff; font-size: 100%; width: 100%;
| contentcss = text-align: left; font-size: 100%; width: 100%;
| header = 15 November 2012
| content =
"Born Free"
"I Loved A Butterfly"
"I (Who Have Nothing)"
"Dust in the Wind"
"Kissing Me"
"Somebody to Love"
"Nothing Really Has Changed"
"Life Is Real"
"The Way We Were"
"Since You've Been Gone"
"'39"
"Something"
"Love Of My Life"
"I'm Not That Girl"
"No-One but You (Only the Good Die Young)"
"Last Horizon"
"Tie Your Mother Down"
"Can't Be Your Friend"
"Knockin' on Heaven's Door"
"We Will Rock You"
"We Are the Champions"
Encore
"In the Bleak Midwinter"
"Born Free"
"Crazy Little Thing Called Love"
}}

{{hidden
| headercss = background: #ccccff; font-size: 100%; width: 100%;
| contentcss = text-align: left; font-size: 100%; width: 100%;
| header = 16 November 2012
| content =
"Born Free"
"I Loved A Butterfly"
"I (Who Have Nothing)"
"Dust in the Wind"
"Kissing Me"
"Somebody to Love"
"Nothing Really Has Changed"
"Life Is Real"
"The Way We Were"
"'39"
"Something"
"Love Of My Life"
"I'm Not That Girl"
"Can't Be Your Friend"
"Good Company
"Tie Your Mother Down"
"No-One but You (Only the Good Die Young)"
"We Will Rock You"
"We Are the Champions"
Encore
"In the Bleak Midwinter"
"Born Free"
"Crazy Little Thing Called Love"
}}

{{hidden
| headercss = background: #ccccff; font-size: 100%; width: 100%;
| contentcss = text-align: left; font-size: 100%; width: 100%;
| header = 17 November 2012
| content =
"Born Free"
"I Loved A Butterfly"
"I (Who Have Nothing)"
"Dust in the Wind"
"Kissing Me"
"Somebody to Love"
"Nothing Really Has Changed"
"Life Is Real"
"The Way We Were"
"'39"
"Something"
"Love Of My Life"
"I'm Not That Girl"
"Can't Be Your Friend"
"Good Company
"Tie Your Mother Down"
"No-One but You (Only the Good Die Young)"
"We Will Rock You"
"We Are the Champions"
Encore
"In the Bleak Midwinter"
"Born Free"
"Crazy Little Thing Called Love"
}}

{{hidden
| headercss = background: #ccccff; font-size: 100%; width: 100%;
| contentcss = text-align: left; font-size: 100%; width: 100%;
| header = 19 November 2012
| content =
"Born Free"
"I Loved A Butterfly"
"I (Who Have Nothing)"
"Dust in the Wind"
"Kissing Me"
"Somebody to Love"
"Nothing Really Has Changed"
"Life Is Real"
"The Way We Were"
"'39"
"Something"
"Love Of My Life"
"I'm Not That Girl"
"Can't Be Your Friend"
"Good Company
"Tie Your Mother Down"
"No-One but You (Only the Good Die Young)"
"We Will Rock You"
"We Are the Champions"
Encore
"In the Bleak Midwinter"
"Born Free"
"Crazy Little Thing Called Love"
}}

References

2012 concert tours